Dioclea guianensis is a species of legume native to the Americas.

References 

Faboideae